Khuian (Urdu, Punjabi: کھوئیاں) is a village  in Talagang , Punjab, Pakistan. It is located 35 km to the west of Talagang City.

Education

Government Schools
 Govt Dgree College Khuian Multan For Women
   Govt Elementary School (GES) Khuian, Chakwal 
 Govt Girls Community Model Elementary School Khuian

Private Schools
 Allied School System, Khuian
 Noble Cambridge School
 Eman Vacational School Khuian

Nearby villages

Tamman
Multan Khurd
Shah Muhammadi
Tarap
Suriali
Kutera
Leti
Noorpur
Dandi
Sangwala
Budhial

Weather

Schools

References

Union councils of Chakwal District
Populated places in Chakwal District